Årstiderna, also known after the opening words Om våren, om våren, is a song written by Alice Tegnér, published in Sjung med oss, mamma!, volume 4 in 1897. Each of the verses represents one of the four seasons, the first taking spring, the second summer, the third autumn, and the last winter. Season songs have since the late 19th century been a common theme in children's songbooks, and in 1943 the song was the first song in the Nu ska vi sjunga songbooks.

Publications 
Sjunga med oss, Mamma! 4, 1897
Nu ska vi sjunga, 1943, under the lines "Årstiderna".

Recordings
An early recording was done in Stockholm in January 1929 by Märta Ekström, with Otto Nordlund playing the piano, and was released as a record in September the same year. The song has also been recorded by Ingela "Pling" Forsman on a 1975 record album with songs from "Nu ska vi sjunga".

References

1897 songs
Swedish children's songs
Swedish-language songs